Gun is a 2010 American crime action film directed by Jessy Terrero, written by 50 Cent and starring himself, Val Kilmer and James Remar. Filming took place in Detroit and Grand Rapids, Michigan.

Synopsis 
Angel (Kilmer) gets out of prison only to get involved in the gun-running ring of his old friend, Rich (Jackson). Rich and friends raid a club, killing Ali Tyrell, another arms dealer.

Later, an officer investigates and calls a meeting, but two ATF agents come in disrupting the meeting. The meeting continues, discussing a mathematics teacher buying a Smith & Wesson firearm but his house gets robbed by a gangster and later he kills someone with the same gun. He subsequently decides to sell the gun back to the same shop, without knowing that the shop owner gives the firearms to Rich and his friends.

Angel meets with Rich who helped him before to move guns. Afterwards, Rich and his friends torture an arms dealer who lied to them. Rich meets a news reporter to talk about the gun business and she takes him to his house.

The next day, Angel meets the officer and it's shown that he was let out of prison to be an informant for them, with a flashback scene  shown his wife being killed. The reporter goes to her wealthy boss to sell advanced guns to Rich, but her boss gives a lecture saying he might be a thug selling guns and saying his family been in the arms business since the Hoover administration now to advanced guns but she says they could trust him.

The next day they meet without knowing that Angel is against them and the police are seeing their every move. The boss introduces himself to Rich and gives his van full of guns to him. He calls one of his minions to give Rich one of the guns to examine. Rich immediately agrees to buy them and is just about to pay when the police attack. During the fight Rich gets shot. Angel rescues him, but when they are alone turns and points his gun at Rich, who realizes that Angel has been the rat all along.

Angel tells him that the cocktail waitress that was killed was his wife. Rich laughs and tells Angel that he is just like him, a killer, and that everybody that Angel has killed was someone's son or husband. As Angel breaks down, Rich pulls a gun, but Angel gets the shot off first. Rich lies on the ground, telling Angel to kill him, that nobody will miss him and that he'll see him in Hell. As Angel is about to kill him, the agent shoots Angel.

As time elapsed, Angel walks down a corridor with a sling on his arm, and he meets with his daughter. The agent is seen walking into his office and is questioned by reporters on how he feels about Rich's plea bargain, and on the rumors that he has stepped down. The movie ends with Rich walking to his cell in handcuffs, and he looks up through the bars as the cell is opening.

Cast 
 50 Cent as Rich
 Val Kilmer as Angel
 AnnaLynne McCord as Gabriella
 James Remar as Detective Rogers
 Malik Barnhardt as Ali
 Paul Calderón as Detective Jenkins
 Christa Campbell as News reporter
 Josh Carrizales as Valentine
 Alton Clinton as Ali's Crew #1
 Jill Dugan as Angel's Wife
 Mark Famiglietti as ATF Agent Peterson
 Gary Darnell Jackson Jr. as Young Rich
 Hassan Johnson as Clinton
 Kristin Kandrac as News Reporter #2
 Anthony Kennedy as Rich's Dad
 John Larroquette as Sam
 Mike Malin as ATF Agent Monroe
 C. Malik Whitfield as Dante

References

External links 
 
 

2010 films
2010 direct-to-video films
American direct-to-video films
2010s English-language films
American crime action films
2010 crime action films
MoviePass Films films
Films set in Detroit
Films about interracial romance
Films directed by Jessy Terrero
2010s American films